Ramazan Gençay (17 February 1961 – December 2018) was a Turkish-born Canadian economist. Born in Turkey, he graduated from Middle East Technical University in Ankara and attended graduate school in North America, where he earned a master's degree from the University of Guelph and a PhD from the University of Houston. He taught economics at the University of Windsor and Carleton University until 2004, and he was a professor of economics at Simon Fraser University from 2004 to 2018. He was "found dead" in Colombia on December 24, 2018 due to suspected scopolamine poisoning. According to SFU, he was "a pioneer in the use of wavelets to analyze financial data, in the analysis of high-frequency data, and [...] in the role of economic networks in financial markets."

References

1961 births
2018 deaths
Canadian people of Turkish descent
Turkish emigrants to Canada
Middle East Technical University alumni
University of Guelph alumni
University of Houston alumni
Academic staff of University of Windsor
Academic staff of Carleton University
Academic staff of Simon Fraser University
20th-century Turkish economists
21st-century Canadian economists
Deaths by poisoning